Choctaw (not to be confused with Choctaw,  Bolivar County) is an unincorporated community and Indian reservation located in Neshoba County, Mississippi, United States.

It is the home of the Mississippi Band of Choctaw Indians, the only federally recognized Indian tribe in Mississippi.

The Choctaw have developed several resorts and attractions on their reservation, including the Pearl River Resort (comprising the Silverstar and Golden Moon casinos), Dancing Rabbit Golf Club, Geyser Falls Water Theme Park, and Lake Pushmataha. This 285-acre (1.2 km) fishing and recreation reservoir opened to the public in 2005.

References

External links

 Mississippi Band of Choctaw Indians

Unincorporated communities in Neshoba County, Mississippi
Unincorporated communities in Mississippi
Mississippi placenames of Native American origin
Mississippi Band of Choctaw Indians